"Beloved" is a single by VNV Nation from their album Futureperfect. It was released in 2002, with the release of the album.

It was released in two CD versions and one limited 12" version.

It charted in the German mainstream Media Control charts for one week at no. 70.

Track listing 

Beloved.1 (CD, Dependent MIND-037)
Beloved (Short Version) 3:53
Beloved (Hiver & Hammer's UK Dub Trip) 8:09
Fearless (Original Version) 6:22
Beloved (Remix By Ernst Horn Of Deine Lakaien) 5:23

Beloved.2 (CD, Dependent MIND-038)
Beloved (Grey Dawn Version By VNV Nation) 7:34
Genesis (Apoptygma Berzerk Remix) 6:40
Holding On (Demo Version)  4:18
Beloved (Tim Schuldt Feat. D-Foundation Remix) 5:27

Beloved.3 (12", 3 Lanka 3-LAN-057)
A1. Beloved (Hiver & Hammer UK Dubtrip) 9:10
B1. Beloved (Hiver & Hammer Full Vocal) 	8:56
B2. Beloved (Hiver & Hammer Full Vocal Edit) 	3:57

References

VNV Nation songs
2002 singles
Futurepop songs